Peter David Godfrey McCormick OBE (born 27 June 1952) is an English lawyer. He is the Senior Partner of McCormicks Solicitors of Harrogate, North Yorkshire, England.

He was educated at Ashville College and King's College London (LLB, 1973).

He was awarded the OBE for services to charity on 1 January 2000. He was awarded the Order of Mercy, in July 2016, by the League of Mercy Foundation, for outstanding voluntary service.

Ranked as one of the top sports lawyers in the country, he is best known as the Chairman of the Legal Advisory Group of the Premier League and Chairman of the League's Football Board. In August 2015, he was unanimously elected by the 20 Premier League Clubs to be a Director of the Football Association (FA), a member of the FA Council, the FA Professional Game Board and the FA International Committee. Prior to these appointments, he was Chairman of the Premier League from March 2014 to June 2015.

In May 2016, he became a member of the Football Regulatory Authority (FRA) which is responsible for regulatory, disciplinary and rule-making for football played in England. He was also appointed Chairman of the FA International Committee; and a member of the FA Group Remuneration Committee, the FA Council Membership and Appointments Committee.

In August 2016, he was appointed Chairman of the FA Group Remuneration Committee, serving a six year term, expiring in July 2022. He remains a member of the Committee. In addition, he was made Chairman of the FA Premier League Medical Care Scheme Ltd, a company providing private health care to 95% of professionals in football in this country.

In July 2017, he was unanimously elected Vice Chairman of the FA, serving a five year term until July 2022.

In November 2018, he was elected Chairman of the Professional Game Board of the FA. 

In November 2020, he was sworn in as interim chairman of the FA replacing Greg Clarke, until a new chairman could be appointed. He held the post until January 2022 when the new independent Chair took office and he continues as an FA Board Member.

In January 2022, he was unanimously appointed by the 20 Premier League Clubs as interim Chairman of the Premier League.

He is Chairman of Premier League Stadium Fund and a Trustee of the Football Foundation.

He was the inaugural Yorkshire Lawyer of the Year and Niche Practice Lawyer of the Year 2000. In 2008, he received the Lifetime Achievement in Business Award at the Ackrill Media Group Business Awards.

He was the inaugural Chairman of Visit Harrogate, the Destination Management Organisation for business and leisure tourism in the Harrogate district. In April 2017, he was appointed a Harrogate Conference Ambassador for the Harrogate Convention Centre.

He is Chairman of War Memorials Trust, Chairman of the Yorkshire Young Achievers Foundation and a Trustee of the Helen Feather Memorial Trust.

He is ranked as a leading expert by the Legal 500 and Chambers UK in Sport, Media and Entertainment, Commercial Litigation, Agriculture and Estates, Charities and Not-for-Profit, Contentious Trusts and Probate, and as a Leading Individual in Yorkshire and the Humber.

References 

1952 births
Living people
People educated at Ashville College
Alumni of King's College London
English lawyers
Officers of the Order of the British Empire